This is a list of notable Filipino athletes.

Alpine Skiers

Michael Teruel
Abel Tesfamariam

American Football

Roman Gabriel
Tim Tebow
Eugene Amano

Archery

Marvin Agustin
Rachel Cabral
Jasmin Figueroa
Mark Javier
Luis Gabriel Moreno

Auto Racing

Marlon Stöckinger

Badminton

Kennevic Asuncion
Conrado Co
Philip Joper Escueta
Peter Gabriel Magnaye

Baseball

Benny Agbayani
Chris Aguila
Bobby Balcena
Jason Bartlett
Bobby Chouinard
Tim Lincecum
Ryuya Ogawa
Clay Rapada
Addison Russell

Basketball

Johnny Abarrientos
Calvin Abueva
Bogs Adornado
Japeth Aguilar
Ato Agustin
Jimmy Alapag
Louie Alas
Raymond Almazan
Marlou Aquino
Ryan Araña
Francis Arnaiz
Nelson Asaytono
Kurt Bachmann
Juneric Baloria
Narciso Bernardo
Ricardo Brown
Mary Ellyn Caasi
Alex Cabagnot
Mark Caguioa
Allan Caidic
Hector Calma
Dionisio Calvo
JV Casio
Jayson Castro
Philip Cezar
Jeff Chan
Atoy Co
Jerry Codiñera
Baby Dalupan
Gary David
Ranidel de Ocampo
Aric del Rosario
Jared Dillinger
Kenneth Duremdes
Valentin Eduque
Bernie Fabiosa
Felicisimo Fajardo
June Mar Fajardo
Ramon Fernandez
Kevin Ferrer
Danny Florencio
Yeng Guiao
Abet Guidaben
Jayjay Helterbrand
Vince Hizon
Cliff Hodge
Dondon Hontiveros
Freddie Hubalde
Danny Ildefonso
JC Intal
Robert Jaworski
Manuel Jocson
Douglas Kramer
Marcio Lassiter
Jojo Lastimosa
Paul Lee
Lim Eng Beng
Samboy Lim
Jun Limpot
Joe Lipa
Carlos Loyzaga
Chito Loyzaga
Chris Lutz
Ronnie Magsanoc
Tommy Manotoc
Vergel Meneses
Eric Menk
Willie Miller
Mucha Mori
Lauro Mumar
Gabe Norwood
Edgardo Ocampo
Ambrosio Padilla
Manny Paner
Benjie Paras
Bobby Ray Parks Jr.
Alvin Patrimonio
Marc Pingris
Leo Prieto
Olsen Racela
Ignacio Ramos
Bong Ravena
Kiefer Ravena
Chot Reyes
Troy Rosario
Chris Ross
Arwind Santos
Nico Salva
Lou Salvador
Danny Seigle
Anthony Semerad
David Semerad
Dante Silverio
Greg Slaughter
Alfonso Solis
Erik Spoelstra
Asi Taulava
Moala Tautuaa
Jeric Teng
Jeron Teng
LA Tenorio
Juami Tiongson
Chris Tiu
Sonny Thoss
Ronald Tubid
Jong Uichico
Turo Valenzona
Freddie Webb
Kelly Williams
James Yap
Andray Blatche

Bowling

Olivia "Bong" Coo
Lita de la Rosa
Rafael "Paeng" Nepomuceno
Biboy Rivera
Arianne Cerdeña
Liza del Rosario
Markwin Tee

Boxing

AJ Banal
Rey Bautista
John Riel Casimero
Denver Cuello
Nonito Donaire
Gabriel Elorde
Ceferino Garcia
Luisito Espinosa
Rey Fortaleza
Mercito Gesta
Sonny Boy Jaro
Rolando Navarrete
Donnie Nietes
Dodie Boy Peñalosa
Gerry Peñalosa
Bobby Pacquiao
Manny Pacquiao
Rudy Salud
Marvin Sonsona
Onyok Velasco
Roel Velasco
Brian Viloria
Pancho Villa
Gretchen Abaniel

Chess

Mark Paragua
Eugenio Torre

Cycling

Norberto Arceo
Christopher Caluag
Daniel Caluag
Benjamin Evangelista
Rolando Guaves
Maximo Junta
Daniel Olivares
Cornelio Padilla
Arturo Romeo
Roberto Roxas

Equestrian

Mikee Cojuangco
Toni Leviste

Fencing

Francisco Dayrit Sr.

Figure Skating

Amanda Evora
Michael Christian Martinez

Football/Soccer

Amani Aguinaldo
David Alaba
Paulino Alcántara
Rodolfo Alicante
Marwin Angeles
Ian Araneta
Misagh Bahadoran
David Basa
Buda Bautista
Alexander Borromeo
Henry Brauner
Nate Burkey
Dennis Cagara
Emelio Caligdong
Jose Ariston Caslib
Jeffrey Christiaens
Heather Cooke
Kenshiro Daniels
Jonathan de Guzman
Jason de Jong
Carli de Murga
Anton del Rosario
Armand Del Rosario
Maria dela Cruz
Patrick Deyto
Curt Dizon
Ruben Doctora
Jimmy Doña
Neil Etheridge
Dave Fegidero
Norman Fegidero
Roel Gener
Rob Gier
Ali Go
Alfredo Razon Gonzalez
Chad Gould
Christopher Greatwich
Phil Greatwich
Simon Greatwich
Ángel Guirado
Juan Luis Guirado
Leigh Gunn
Mark Hartmann
Matthew Hartmann
Joana Houplin
Patrice Impelido
Ray Anthony Jónsson
Virgilio Lobregat
Jerry Lucena
Lexton Moy
Paul Mulders
Roland Müller
Ernest Nierras
Samantha Nierras
Nick O'Donnell
Demitrius Omphroy
Satoshi Otomo
Manuel Ott
Inna Palacios
Marisa Park
Javier Patiño
Gino Pavone
Marlon Piñero
OJ Porteria
Patrick Reichelt
Simone Rota
Jason Sabio
Eduard Sacapaño
Daisuke Sato
Stephan Schröck
Jesse Shugg
Álvaro Silva
Martin Steuble
Yuji Takahashi
Junichi Tanaka
Tomas Trigo
Yannick Tuason
Sebastian Ugarte
Mark Villon
Camille Wilson
Denis Wolf
James Younghusband
Phil Younghusband

Frisbee

Derek Ramsay

Golf

Dorothy Delasin
Frankie Miñoza
Jennifer Rosales
Yuka Saso
Bianca Pagdanganan
Miguel Luis Tabuena
Angelo Que

Gymnastics

Bea Lucero
Carlos Yulo

Karate

Gretchen Malalad

Mixed Martial Arts

Eduard Folayang
Mark Muñoz
Brandon Vera
Amado Benito Jr.
Rolando Dy

Motorsport

Maico Buncio

Pole Vault

EJ Obiena

Pool and Snooker

Ronato Alcano
Django Bustamante
Rodolfo Luat
Marlon Manalo
Dennis Orcollo
Alex Pagulayan
Jose "Amang" Parica
Efren "Bata" Reyes

Professional Wrestling

Fallah Bahh
Dave Batista
Shotzi Blackheart
T. J. Perkins
Syuri
Joaquin Wilde

Rugby Football

Kevin Gordon
Gareth Holgate
Michael Letts
Expo Mejia
David Robinson-Polkey
Matthew Saunders
Oliver Saunders
Matt Srama
Eric Tai
Jake Ward
Kenneth West
Andrew Wolff

Skateboarding

Sean Malto
Willy Santos
Margielyn Arda Didal
Kiko Jericho Francisco
Christiana Means
Renzo Feliciano
Roan Arguelles
John Flory Panugalinog
Rob Meronek
Arianne Trinidad
Gregorio Chaves III
Johnny Boy Tagay
Gieliane Harbaliga
John Lenard Ravanera
Renz Gelig
Kristel De Jesus
Mark Barrientos
Marineth Repia
Dennis Malinis
Sandy Pareds
Yuta Iwai
Vincent Bobotiok
Ajay Gamboa
Zeonard Bernabe
Basty Magbalana
Jerome Piealago
Demetrio Raphael Cuevas
Ale Aranzaso
Matthew Tuddao
Ronald Mamon
Justin Egloso
John Roswell Segarra
Luis Hindap
Ramil Frias
Juan Excekielle Juta
Howard Esguerra
Rhyn Zidjan Bilowa
John Michael Cawas
Irie Isla
Ej De Lera
Eunice Quilantang
Kenneth Evangelista
Marvin Basinal
Jeff Gonzales

Sports Shooting

Eric Ang
Enrique Beech
Félix Cortes
Jethro Dionisio
Martin Gison
Otoniel Gonzaga
César Jayme
Paul Brian Rosario
Albert von Einsiedel

Sumo Wrestling

Masunoyama Tomoharu

Swimming

Jasmine Al-Khaldi
Ryan Arabejo
Eric Buhain
Dionisio Calvo
Daniel Coakley
Enchong Dee
Christine Jacob
Jessie Lacuna
Agapito Lozada
Miguel Mendoza
Miguel Molina
Gerardo Rosario
Christel Simms
Akiko Thomson
Teófilo Yldefonso
James Walsh

Table Tennis

Ian Lariba

Taekwondo

Japoy Lizardo
Monsour del Rosario
Roberto Cruz (taekwondo)
Toni Rivero
Tshomlee Go
Donnie Geisler

Tennis

Nino Alcantara
Felicisimo Ampon
Johnny Arcilla
Marian Capadocia
Dyan Castillejo
Raymundo Deyro
Ruben Gonzales
Treat Conrad Huey
Katharina Lehnert
Cecil Mamiit
Eric Taino
Manny Tolentino

Track & Field

Alejo Alvarez
Hector Begeo
Trenten Beram
Eduardo Buenavista
David Bunevacz
Fortunato Catalon
Eric Cray
Henry Dagmil
Lydia de Vega
Isidro del Prado
Andres Franco
Lerma Gabito
David Nepomuceno
Genaro Saavedra
Juan Taduran
Simeon Toribio
Miguel White
Regino Ylanan
Simeon Toribio

Triathlete

Rudy Fernandez

Volleyball

Teresita Abundo
Rongomaipapa Amy Ahomiro
Fille Cainglet
Rachel Anne Daquis
Ella de Jesus
Rhea Katrina Dimaculangan
Jem Ferrer
Victonara Galang
Dzi Gervacio
Jovelyn Gonzaga
Michele Gumabao
Gretchen Ho
Denden Lazaro
Aby Maraño
Aiza Maizo-Pontillas
Jia Morado
Mika Reyes
Cristina Salak
Aleona Denise Santiago
Charo Soriano
Maria Paulina Soriano
Maria Angeli Tabaquero
Alyssa Valdez
Jethro Jacob Candelon Zulueta

Wushu

Amado Benito Jr.
Mark Eddiva
Jessie Aligaga

See also
List of Filipino American sportspeople